The Warrior's Heart is a 1992 Norwegian film, directed by Leidulv Risan and starring Anneke von der Lippe, Peter Snickars, Thomas Kretschmann, Bjørn Sundquist and Iren Reppen. It was screened out of competition at the 1992 Cannes Film Festival. The film was selected as the Norwegian entry for the Best Foreign Language Film at the 65th Academy Awards, but was not accepted as a nominee.

Plot
A love story during the Second World War in Scandinavia. Ann Mari, a Norwegian, works as a nurse in the Winter War of 1939/40 between Finland and the Soviet Union. She falls in love with the Finnish soldier Markus. The war stops temporarily, and they settle down in northern Norway. Norway gets occupied by Germany and Markus leaves Ann Mari, as Finland goes to war again to win back the lost territory. A short time later Markus seems to be dead and Ann Mari falls in love with the German soldier Maximilian. But Markus soon returns alive. After a struggle for Ann Mari the three take refuge from the Germans to Sweden, but Sweden deports foreign deserters.

Cast
 Anneke von der Lippe as Ann Mari Salmi
 Peter Snickars as Markus Salmi
 Thomas Kretschmann as Lt. Maximillian Luedt
 Mona Hofland as Ann Mari's mother
 Juha Muje as Olli
 Bjørn Sundquist as Karl Simonnaes
 Solfrid Heier as Mrs. Simmonaes
 Iren Reppen as Kari Simonnaes
 Paul-Ottar Haga as Claus
 Per Christensen as Vicar
 Werner Heinrich Möller as Claus
 Christoph Künzler as Captain

See also
 List of submissions to the 65th Academy Awards for Best Foreign Language Film
 List of Norwegian submissions for the Academy Award for Best Foreign Language Film

References

External links
 

1992 films
1990s Norwegian-language films
1992 drama films
Norwegian World War II films
Films directed by Leidulv Risan
Winter War in popular culture
Norwegian war drama films